Standard, released in 1993 on A&M Records, is a gospel music album by American urban contemporary gospel group Witness. The album contains the title track, "Standard" and the song "Get in the Way", which won the GMWA Excellence Award for Best Contemporary Song. The group won the Stellar Award for Best Contemporary Group Performance.

Track listing 
"Standard" - 5:37
"Believe" - 4:52
"Since He Came" - 4:22
"Beginning" - 4:35
"Safety" - 6:09
"Get in the Way" - 4:29
"Don't Take It Away" - 3:58
"Magnify" - 4:18
"Remember" - 6:07
"The Latter" - 4:28

Personnel
Lisa Page Brooks: Vocals, 
Laeh Page: Vocals
Diane Campbell: Vocals
Lou Ann Stewart: Vocals

Charts

References

1993 albums
Witness (gospel group) albums